James Bond Kamwambi (25 November 1967 – 5 February 2021) was a Malawian politician.

Biography
He served as a member of the National Assembly of Malawi for the Democratic Progressive Party, representing Karonga North West from 2014 till his death on 5 February 2021 from COVID-19 in Chitipa during the COVID-19 pandemic in Malawi.

References

2021 deaths
Democratic Progressive Party (Malawi) politicians
Deaths from the COVID-19 pandemic in Malawi
Members of the National Assembly (Malawi)